Wasserman (formerly Wasserman Media Group) is a sports marketing and talent management company based in Los Angeles. Casey Wasserman, grandson of media mogul Lew Wasserman, founded the company in 1998 and acts as its chief executive.

History 
In 2002, Wasserman acquired the sports marketing and naming-rights company Envision and the action sports marketing and representation firm The Familie, based in Carlsbad, California.

In 2004, Wasserman purchased 411 Productions and a few months later relaunched it as Studio 411, a sports entertainment film studio. The business was designed to provide financing, obtain sponsorships and arrange distribution in support of original productions. The company also made an unsuccessful bid to sign up enough athletes in BMX, skateboarding and freestyle motocross  to form PGA-like sanctioning bodies in those sports.

In January, 2006 Wasserman acquired the NBA and MLB sports agent business of Arn Tellem, a well-known sports agent who joined Wasserman as well. Several of Tellem's sports agent colleagues also joined the company as part of the deal. Until he retired in June, 2015, Tellem was a principal at the company and ran one of its management groups.

In November 2006, the company acquired soccer agency SFX, in the UK. Through that acquisition, Wasserman came to represent players including Steven Gerrard, Robbie Keane, Jamie Carragher, Michael Owen, Tim Cahill, Jonathan Woodgate, Alex Morgan, Tobin Heath, Heather O'Reilly, Wes Brown, Scott Parker, Jack Wilshere, Park Ji-Sung, Shay Given, Tim Howard and Emile Heskey.

In June 2007, Wasserman expanded its consulting and media and property capabilities by purchasing Raleigh, North Carolina-based OnSport.

In early 2011, Wasserman bought London-based media rights manager and advisory firm Reel Enterprises.

That year Wasserman expanded its golf talent roster by acquiring SFX Golf in April 2011.

In 2015, Wasserman acquired Laundry Service, which included Cycle, a network of social media influencers. The advertising agency was named one of the Ad Age agencies to watch in January 2015.

In March 2021, Wasserman acquired German based boxing promotional company Team Sauerland. With the announcement they revealed the company would be relocating to the United Kingdom.

In March 2021, Wasserman acquired the North American Music division of the Los Angeles-based Paradigm Talent Agency.

In April 2021, Wasserman acquired the Boston-based ‘Ideas and Access’ Gen Z geared Marketing Agency: Riddle & Bloom.

Riddle & Bloom will be fully rebranded as Wasserman in Q3.

References

Mass media companies established in 1998
Companies based in Los Angeles